The Jardin botanique de Saint Xist (900 m²) is a botanical garden located in Le Clapier, Aveyron, Midi-Pyrénées, France. It is open weekends without charge in the warmer months.

The garden is located adjacent to the 10th-century church of Saint Xist, and contains nearly 300 species of herbs and medicinal plants as were once found in the monastery's "garden of simples". It is maintained in association with the Jardin des plantes de Montpellier.

See also 
 List of botanical gardens in France

References 
 Office de Tourisme du Larzac - Jardin botanique de Saint Xist
 Parcs et Jardins description (French)
 Gralon.net description (French)
 Culture.fr description (French)

Saint Xist, Jardin botanique de
Saint Xist, Jardin botanique de